Homalopteroides smithi is a species of ray-finned fish in the genus Homalopteroides. It can be found in the Mekong and Chao Phraya basins and Malay Peninsula.

The fish is named in honor of ichthyologist Hugh M. Smith (1865-1941), then at the Siam Department of Fisheries, in what is now Thailand.

Other common names include the Green Gecko Loach or Shi's Flatfin Loach (a direct translation of the fish's chinese name '史氏平鰭鰍').

References

Fish of Thailand
Balitoridae
Taxa named by Sunder Lal Hora
Fish described in 1932